"P.I.M.P." is a song by American rapper 50 Cent, from his debut studio album Get Rich or Die Tryin' (2003). The song features production from Mr. Porter of D12 and was mixed by Dr. Dre.

A remixed version of the song, featuring fellow rappers Snoop Dogg, Lloyd Banks and Young Buck, was released as the album's fourth official single on August 12, 2003, although the remix was not initially part of the track listing; it was later added as a bonus track to some digital editions of the album.

Upon its release, "P.I.M.P." was a significant commercial success, especially in the United States, where it peaked at number 3 on the Billboard Hot 100 and reached the Top 10 of many national charts worldwide. The song was later certified Gold by the RIAA for sales of 500,000+ copies.

Content
Musically, the song is based on a highly steelpan prominent production from Mr. Porter from D12, and although it is predominantly a rap song, features elements of other genres, especially reggae, or music similar to that of the Caribbean. Lyrically, the song glorifies 50 Cent's supposed involvement in the 'pimp' lifestyle.

Music video
The music video features the four rappers rapping with topless women. The video comes in two slightly different versions: one with the topless women and a "clean" version without. On July 15, 2003, the video debuted on MTV's Total Request Live at number nine and stayed on the chart for fifty days. At the 2004 MTV Video Music Awards, it was nominated for Best Rap Video, but lost to Jay-Z's "99 Problems".

The video had 50 Cent trying to audition to become a member of the P.I.M.P. Legion of Doom that is led by Snoop Dogg's character. When asked why they should let him join the P.I.M.P. Legion of Doom as he doesn't have a Cadillac and/or a perm, 50 Cent ends up winning their favor by showing off his Magic Stick.

Samples and covers
In 2008, the Bacao Rhythm & Steel Band released a cover version of "P.I.M.P." from their album Look-A Py Py. This was such a faithful version that many people incorrectly said that it was the source of the steel drum tune used in the 50 Cent single. This, of course, is not possible since the Bacao single was released five years after 50 Cent had released "P.I.M.P.".

Additional covers of the song included those on Hip Hop Baby (a 2004 compilation album of kid-friendly tunes from the group Tunes for Baby That Won't Drive You Crazy), and "P.I.N.T.", a parody version by British rapper 50 Pence (from his 2004 album, 50 Pence Presents).

Legal controversy
In June 2016, producer Brandon Parrott sued almost everyone involved with the 50 Cent record Get Rich or Die Tryin, claiming that he was tricked into licensing the use of a beat from his track "BAMBA". Aftermath Records & Universal requested that the case be dismissed on the grounds that Parrott had already been compensated in an earlier settlement. Judge S. James Otero dismissed the complaint without leave to amend in November 2016.

Track listing
 UK CD single'
 "P.I.M.P." – 4:09
 "P.I.M.P. (Remix)" (featuring Snoop Dogg, Lloyd Banks and Young Buck) – 4:47
 "8 More Miles" (featuring G-Unit) – 3:08
 "P.I.M.P." – The Video (Director's cut) – 4:10

Charts

Weekly charts

Year-end charts

Certifications

References

External links
50 Cent's official website

Songs about procurers
2003 singles
50 Cent songs
G-Unit songs
Snoop Dogg songs
Music videos directed by Chris Robinson (director)
Songs written by 50 Cent
Lloyd Banks songs
Young Buck songs
Songs written by Denaun Porter
Shady Records singles
Aftermath Entertainment singles
Interscope Records singles
2003 songs